Chimá is a town and municipality located in the Córdoba Department, northern Colombia.

References
 Gobernacion de Cordoba - Chimá
 Chimá official website

Cordoba